Krasnoyarsk International Airport , is a major airport in Krasnoyarsk Krai, Russia,  northwest of Krasnoyarsk. , it was the  biggest in Russia in passenger traffic.

History

Construction of the airport started in 1970. It opened for operations in 1980.

In 2005, the airport launched Terminal 2 for handling transit and international passengers. By 2006, the old runway coating had been replaced by asphalt-concrete layer with reinforced polymeric netting.

In November 2007, it was announced that Lufthansa Cargo might switch its Asian refueling and distribution point from Astana, Kazakhstan to Krasnoyarsk (Yemelyanovo) International Airport, because Russia would no longer permit Lufthansa the use of its air space for their Europe to Asia flights unless they could sell fuel. In July 2008, Lufthansa stated that it would move its cargo logistics hub from Astana to Krasnoyarsk (Yemelyanovo) once the airport was brought up to ICAO safety standards. The cargo terminal of Lufthansa Cargo in Krasnoyarsk (Yemelyanovo) airport was its second largest one after Frankfurt. However, in October 2016, Lufthansa Cargo switched all flights from Krasnoyarsk (Yemelyanovo) to another Siberian airport Tolmachevo (Novosibirsk) citing its better infrastructure and the ability to outsource certain services whereas in Krasnoyarsk the company “had to involve its own personnel and equipment”. On the other hand, AirBridgeCargo Airlines switched its activities vice versa from Tolmachevo Airport to Yemelyanovo in January 2018.

In 2008, the modern Arrivals Terminal with the capacity of 750 passengers per hour was opened. Also in 2008, the lighting facilities were reconstructed and the new hi-intensity lighting system was installed: the centerline lights and the touchdown zone lights. In 2011, the airport handled over 1.6 million passengers, a 28% increase over 2010.

In November 2017, the general director of the airport has announced that the airport will now be called Krasnoyarsk-International, instead of Krasnoyarsk-Yemelyanovo. It is unknown if the airport has as yet been officially renamed.

Before 2019, RZD made a decision to construct a railway line to the airport, but due to escape of high ticket price and small train occupancy, this will not be an Aeroexpress route, this will be a simple commuter service. Nevertheless, the route will also serve cargo trains, to deliver air-cargo goods directly to Krasnoyarsk.

In March 2019, Aeroflot signed an agreement with the government of the Krasnoyarsk region and Yemelyanovo Airport to create a local international hub. The project will start in 2020. On 31 May 2021, Aeroflot officially commenced its hub operation in Krasnoyarsk.

Location
Krasnoyarsk Yemelyanovo's location is an unusual case, as the airfield is located right next to a smaller airfield, Cheremshanka. The reason this is unusual and slightly problematic is that since Cheremshanka is right next to the airfield, it can be easily confused as being Yemelyanovo, and what adds to the location issue is the fact that both airfields share their runway bearings - 11/29 - with each other. This, as a result, makes the two airports look like one, which is especially problematic as the only way to distinguish the two is the runway lengths - Cheremshanka has a shorter runway than Yemelyanovo - and the fact that no taxiway connects the two airfields.

Facilities

At present, the airport provides a full array of passenger handling services in all three terminals, including VIP services, a business lounge, baby/parent room, ATMs, shops, cafés, bars, a drugstore and a post office. Runway 29 is certified for ILS Category II operations. The runway condition, the facilities and the technology of aircraft handling allows the airport to service more than 50 types of passenger and freighter aircraft, up to and including the Boeing 777, Boeing 767, Boeing 747, Airbus A330 family, McDonnell Douglas MD-11, Antonov An-124 and others.

At Krasnoyarsk (Yemelyanovo) International Airport, the new terminal is under construction and currently the construction is planned to finish by November 2017. On 16 December 2017, the airport plans to test the new passenger terminal and to commence operations also in December. The terminal will have 6 air-bridges.

On 8 December 2017, the new baggage system was tested at the airport, another testing opening is planned on 16 December. The airport opened officially on 26 December 2017, with the flight commencement on the next day, with NordStar Boeing 737-800 to Norilsk.

On 16 March 2018, the air-bridges started working, by accepting the first flight from Moscow-Domodedovo of Globus Airlines GH73, that arrived at 18:50.

The terminal currently serves domestic routes, which made terminal 1 to shut down the passenger service on 27 December. The international flights will shift in 2018 and then terminal 2 will shut down the service and the new terminal will be the only passenger terminal in the airport.

The re-construction of Terminal 1 is currently in process and it is planned to be changed in design, to easily integrate with the new terminal, and function. The old terminal will turn into a conference centre, to accept VIP flights more smoothly.

Airlines and destinations

Passenger

Cargo

Statistics

Annual traffic

Incidents and accidents 
 On 23 December 1984, Aeroflot Flight 3519 crashed at the airport during an emergency landing, killing all but one of the 111 people on board.

See also 
 List of the busiest airports in Russia
 List of the busiest airports in the former USSR
 Krasnoyarsk Cheremshanka Airport

References

External links

 Krasnoyarsk Airport at Russian Airports Database
 Historical Weather Records for Krasnoyarsk
 
 
 

Airports in Krasnoyarsk Krai
Krasnoyarsk
Airports built in the Soviet Union
Airports established in 1980
1980 establishments in Russia